Persatuan Sepakbola Indonesia Surakarta (commonly known as PERSIS Solo, literally translates to Indonesian Football Association of Surakarta), is an Indonesian football club based in the Central Java city of Surakarta. Founded on 8 November 1923 as Vorstenlandschen Voetbal Bond (English: Royal Football Association; abbreviated as VVB), it was officially renamed to its current brand in 1935.

PERSIS returned to top-flight football after a decade in 2022 following its success in winning the 2021 Liga 2 title. The club plays its Liga 1 home games at Manahan Stadium, which has a capacity of 20,000 spectators. The 2021 revival of the club was driven by its new, politically-connected owners - Kaesang Pangarep, the youngest son of President Joko Widodo who acts as the club's chairman, and State-Owned Enterprises Minister Erick Thohir.

History
PERSIS Solo was established on 8 November 1923, Sastrosaksono from the M.A.R.S club and Raden Ngabehi Reksohadiprojo and Sutarman from the Romeo club initiated the formation of the Vorstenlandsche Voetbal Bond (VVB) as the forerunner of a football club that is the pride of the people of Solo. It is based on the belief of the three figures that the game of football can be played by anyone without any certain limitations.

On 28 October 1928, VVB reacted to the moment of the Youth Pledge of 1928, since 1935 then VVB changed its name to Persatuan Sepakraga Indonesia Soerakarta (PERSIS). This name change is a form of appreciation for the values ​​of struggle and unity contained in the contents of the youth oath. Informally, the name PERSIS began to be used by the club.

On 19 April 1930, they participated in the founding of the Indonesian football federation called PSSI (In Indonesian: Persatuan Sepakbola Seluruh Indonesia) with six clubs, Bandoengsche Indonesische Voetbal Bond (Persib Bandung), Indonesische Voetbal Bond Magelang (PPSM Magelang), Madioensche Voetbal Bond (PSM Madiun), United Sepakraga Mataram (PSIM Yogyakarta), Soerabajasche Indonesische Voetbal Bond (Persebaya Surabaya), and Voetbalbond Indonesische Jacarta (Persija Jakarta). The establishment of PSSI came from the spirit of the Indonesian people's struggle against Dutch imperialism at that time, and on 12 May 1933, PERSIS began to be inaugurated by the club through internal deliberation and began to be used officially.

PERSIS Solo began to be known by the people of Solo. Then, they began to be based at the Manahan Stadium and Sriwedari Stadium which were used as the team's training center, they also cannot be separated from their fanatical supporters, Pasoepati. With the support of Pasoepati and the residents of Solo, they have also won several PSSI Perserikatan competitions seven times, namely in 1935, 1936, 1939, 1940, 1941, 1942, and 1943. Not only did they excel in the 1990s. PERSIS Solo started appearing in national football in 2006.

The momentum for PERSIS Solo's revival was only felt that year. The local government took them seriously and succeeded in being promoted to the highest caste at the time, Liga Indonesia Premier Division. PERSIS Solo was able to produce talented young players at that time, two of whom were goalkeeper Wahyu Tri Nugroho and defender Wahyu Wijiastanto. Both managed to enter the Indonesia national team.

PERSIS Solo became its own strength in 2007–08 Liga Djarum. They brought in big-name players, Greg Nwokolo, Harry Saputra, Rudi Widodo, Alvin Kie, and Frank Seator. Unfortunately, being in the highest caste only lasted a short time. In the following season, PSSI compiled the highest level competition under the name Indonesia Super League in 2008. PERSIS Solo was only able to finish in 10th place in the western group and failed to survive at the main level.

Grounds

Stadium 

PERSIS Solo plays their home matches at Manahan Stadium. Manahan Stadiums design adheres to the international standards for stadium design, which is completed with 20,000 individual seats. The grass used is Grass Dactylon Cynodon, which is of FIFA standard class. The stadium is equipped with: a football pitch, international-standard athletics, a dressing room, a heating room, a health room, a secretariat, a journalist and a press conference room, and some offices.

Training ground 
For the primary training ground, PERSIS uses the Sriwedari Stadium at Slamet Riyadi Road, Kotabarat football field, or Banyuanyar football field.

Sponsorship
The complete sponsors are as follow.

Main sponsors
 Garena Free Fire
 Aladin Bank

Other sponsors
 Gurih
 Vidio
 ID Express
 Gojek

Supporters and Rivalrires

Supporters
PERSIS Solo's supporters are called Pasoepati. Founded in 2000 with red color as their identity. Pasoepati is one of the biggest football club supporters in Central Java.

Surakartans is one of PERSIS Solo loyal and biggest supporter, with casual culture as their identity.

Indonesia's first and only Formula One driver Rio Haryanto is a biggest fan of PERSIS Solo.

Rivalries
PERSIS Solo has a rivalry with PSIM Yogyakarta this derby is called Mataram Derby, the beginning of this rivalry is the animosity between club supporters, PERSIS's Pasoepati and PSIM's Brajamusti.

PERSIS has a rivalry with PSIS Semarang this derby is called Central Java Derby taken from Central Java the province where both clubs located.

PERSIS Solo has a rivalry with PSCS Cilacap this derby is called South Central Java Derby  which situated from the south of Central Java where Surakarta and Cilacap were located.

Personnel

Technical staff

Players

Current squad

Naturalized players

Out on loan

Retired numbers
 17 – Ferry Anto (posthumous)
 12 – Supporters’ number (the 12th player)

Honours

References

External links

PasoepatiNet
SambernyawaCom

 
Football clubs in Indonesia
Football clubs in Central Java
Association football clubs established in 1923
1923 establishments in the Dutch East Indies